Itajaí is a municipality in the state of Santa Catarina, Brazil. It is located on the northern central coast of Santa Catarina and is part of the Vale do Itajaí Mesoregion, on the right bank of the Itajaí-Açu river mouth. It lies at the mouth of the Itajaí River, at 20 feet (6 metres) above sea level. The city has the 2nd largest gross domestic product and the highest per capita income in the State of Santa Catarina.

History
The city was founded on June 15, 1860, but the colonization of Itajaí had started in 1658 when the Paulista João Dias D’Arzão arrived in the region. In 1750, Portuguese colonists coming from Madeira and the Azores made this region their home. By 1823 it became a prominent region for Portuguese settlers and, at the end of the 19th century, received a great number of German immigrants.

Itajaí and most of Santa Catarina State area is prone to torrential storms specially during the Spring season. Floods are frequent and even tornadoes can form.

In late November 2008, around 100 people perished in floods due to the long lasting showers that fell in Southeastern and Southern Brazil. 90% of the city was underwater and the port was partially destroyed. Many lost their homes and other possessions and had no ready shelters to turn to, for the rain combined with river waters invaded every section of the city and most of Central and Coastal Santa Catarina State. President Lula da Silva and other officials flew over the area to evaluate the damage and offer help. The state was declared a disaster area by the State and Federal governments.

Demography 
The majority of the population is descended from Germans, Italians and Azoreans. The mixture of German, Italian and Portuguese cultures is a landmark of the city.

Source: IBGE Census 2010

It is estimated that of the little more than 200 thousand inhabitants of the city, about 190 thousand live in the urban area and 10 thousand in the rural area. According to the IBGE census, the population is approximately 51% female and 49% male.

Religion 

The predominant religions in the municipality are the Roman Catholic (approximately 61% of the population) and Evangelical (approximately 28% of the population). There are also practitioners of other religions, such as spiritist, umbanda, candomblé and Buddhism, but with less representation.

Geography

It occupies an area of 304 km ², 20% urban and 80% rural (or conservation areas).

Is located on the north coast of Santa Catarina State, specifically at the mouth of the Itajaí-Açu river. It borders onto the cities of Balneário Camboriú, Camboriú, Brusque, Gaspar, Ilhota and Navegantes. Headquarters of the largest fishing port in the country and the largest university in the state, the Univali (Universidade do Vale do Itajaí).

Itajaí is located in the Lower Valley of Rio Itajaí, the coast and the Atlantic Ocean. It is situated at the mouth of the Itajaí-Açu river, allowing the existence of the port.

The city is basically flat - due to being at sea level The highest point is Morro da Cruz, 170 meters above sea level. It was part of the defunct metropolitan area of Foz do Rio Itajaí, together with the neighboring municipalities.

Itajaí hosts one of the biggest festivals of Brazilian popular music. The festival is held every October and brings together musicians and artists from around the country. These meetings are a display of the culture of Itajaí.

The BR-101 is the main link to the city, and highways SC-100, BR-486, SC-470 and BR-470, Itajaí link to the rest of the state.

Climate
Itajaí has a humid subtropical climate (Köppen climate classification: Cfa) humid in winter and dry in summer. In summer temperatures can reach 40 °C (Temperature reached in 2000) and during the winter they can get as low as 5 °C. It is very rare to get temperatures outside this range. There are reports that the lowest temperature ever recorded in Itajaí was -1 °C in 1975.

Economy

International trade

As of 2014, the municipality of Itajaí conducted 1.61% of  Brazil's total export trade with $3.91B (USD) worth of goods.  This figure places Itajaí as the 8th highest exporter in Brazil.  Of this, 86% or $3.35B (USD) was made up by the trade of animal products.  The top five material goods exported by Itajaí for that year were poultry meat (52%), pork (21%), other prepared meat (9.6%), preserved meat (7.3%), and frozen bovine meat (2.2%).

Port of Itajaí
The Port of Itajaí is the main port of Santa Catarina, and the second largest in Brazil in terms of the movement of containers. It serves as the main port for exports in the region, and almost all production of the state of Santa Catarina moves through it at some point.

Tourism
Itajaí has many beaches, among them are the Molhes, Atalaia, Jeremias, Cabeçudas, Morcego, Brava (Angry) Beach and Solidão. 
One well-known tourist attraction is the Parrot's Beak, a 6-meter-tall rock in the shape of a parrot. 
The city also has extensive rural areas and natural scenery, with a rich heritage of the Portuguese and German immigrants.
Itajaí has a píer for passenger vessels, serving the coast of Santa Catarina and used by the customs, which guides ships in by laser.
The Marejada, a Portuguese festival of fishing and seafood, is the principal festival of the city, showcasing attractions relative to the ocean and the Azores. Itajaí is also the hub of Nautical Club Marcílio Dias, a sport association for both football (soccer) and competitive rowing.

In 2013 it has been chosen as the arrival point of the Transat Jacques Vabre and it was a stopover for the Volvo Ocean Race in 2012, 2015 and 2018.

The city is served by Ministro Victor Konder International Airport located in the adjoining municipality of Navegantes.

Each October, yearly celebrate Marejada carried out in Itajaí from 1987.

Twin towns – sister cities

Itajaí is twinned with:

 Melipilla, Melipilla Province, Chile
 Pompano Beach, Florida, United States
 Sodegaura, Chiba, Japan
 Viana do Castelo, North Region, Portugal
 Xinxiang, Henan, China

References

External links

 The City of Itajaí Website
 The Port of Itajaí Website

Populated coastal places in Santa Catarina (state)
Populated places established in 1860
Municipalities in Santa Catarina (state)
1860 establishments in Brazil
Port cities in Brazil